KJWL is a commercial radio station located in Fresno, California, broadcasting on 99.3 FM. The station airs a classic hits format and is branded as "K-Jewel 99.3 FM". Its studios are located on the Fulton Mall strip in downtown Fresno, while its transmitter is located atop the Golden State County Plaza, also in downtown.

History
The station signed on the air in 1994 as KJWL with an adult standards music format. The station later evolved towards soft adult contemporary, and then adult album alternative, all under the "K-Jewel" branding.

On January 2, 2017, after stunting on New Year's Day with a loop of "Right Now" by Van Halen (as "K-Jewel" moved to KJZN and shifted back to Soft AC), KJWL flipped to Top 40/CHR as "99.3 Now FM". On January 5, 2017, KJWL changed its call letters to KJZN. On January 18, 2017, KJZN changed its call letters to KWDO.

On May 23, 2022, it was announced that the KJWL call letters and its classic hits format would move back to 99.3 FM on May 30.

Previous logo

References

External links

JWL
Classic hits radio stations in the United States
Radio stations established in 1995
1995 establishments in California